Frederick J. Daly was an American football and baseball player and coach.  He played college football for Yale University in 1909 and 1910 and was selected as the captain of the 1910 Yale team.  He was also the athletic director at Williams College from 1914 to 1916 and head coach of the Williams Ephs football team from 1911 to 1915, compiling a record of 19–18–3.

Head coaching record

References

Year of birth missing
Year of death missing
American football halfbacks
Williams Ephs athletic directors
Williams Ephs football coaches
Yale Bulldogs football players